Shahdara Bagh Junction railway station (Urdu and ) is located in Shahdara Bagh, Lahore District of Punjab province of Pakistan.

See also
 List of railway stations in Pakistan
 Pakistan Railways

References

External links

Railway stations in Sheikhupura District
Railway stations on Shahdara Bagh–Chak Amru Branch Line
Railway stations on Shahdara Bagh–Sangla Hill Branch Line
Railway stations on Karachi–Peshawar Line (ML 1)